MTV Ao Vivo is the first live album released by Brazilian band Nando Reis e os Infernais.

Previously unreleased songs information

"Mantra" 
"Mantra" was featured on soundtrack of Rede Globo's telenovela Começar de Novo. It was written by Reis and Arnaldo Antunes and it was developed upon the sketch of a song he wrote under Paula Lavigne's request for a song to Ricky Martin at the time Reis was with Titãs recording Volume Dois.

According to Reis, many radio stations controlled by protestants refused to air the song due to it promoting a different religion, which disappointed him and which he considered censorship.

Reis proposed inviting Hare Krishnas to perform in the song during a meeting with MTV and label Universal Music Group, but a few days before the trip to Porto Alegre, where the album was recorded, the label announced they wouldn't pay for the group's trip. Reis then decided to use his own money and bought some bus tickets for them. Following the song's first performance, which he says was well-received by the audience, Universal's executives congratulated him and the song was later chosen as the album's single.

"Por Onde Andei" 
"Por Onde Andei" was written after Reis was robbed in São Paulo. Before taking off with his car, one of the criminals rolled down the window, pointed a gun to him and yelled: "bum! bum!". Reis thought the criminal would really shoot and kill him and many thoughts passed through his mind.

The verse "e a falta é a morte da esperança" ("absence is the death of hope"), according to Reis, is wrong; the original verse said "e a morte é a falta da esperança" ("death is the absence of hope"), but he sang it wrong during the song's performance and this version became official.

"Pomar" 
The track was co-written by Paulo Monteiro and performed by Reis's first band, Os Camarões, formed to perform at a music festival at Colégio Santa Cruz in 1979, in which they were winners.

"Do Seu Lado" 
This track had already been released by Jota Quest on their MTV ao Vivo album. It was written by Reis in Taos, United States, where he was recording overdubs for his then future album A Letra A with producer and drummer Barrett Martin. Martin was dating a native American from a nearby pueblo. One night, Reis took part in a shamanic ritual and, soon after, he had a seat by Martin's fireplace and quickly wrote the song which, according to him, became his possibly greatest hit.

Track listing

Personnel
 Nando Reis - vocals, acoustic guitar on all tracks
 Alex Veley - keyboards on all tracks except "Meu Aniversário" and "Pomar"
 Carlos Pontual - guitar, backing vocals on all tracks except "Meu Aniversário" and "Pomar"
 Felipe Cambraia - bass guitar, backing vocals on all tracks except "Meu Aniversário" and "Pomar"
 João Vianna - drums on all tracks except "Meu Aniversário", "Quase Que Dezoito" and "Pomar"

Session/guest musicians 
 Diogo Gameiro - drums on "Quase que Dezoito"
 Banda Ultramen (on "Pomar")
 Tonho Crocco - vocals
 Pedro Porto - bass
 Júlio Porto - guitar
 Zé Darcy - drums
 Leonardo Boff - keyboards
 Marcito e Malásia - percussion
 Anderson - DJ

 Guest musicians on "Mantra"
 André Gomes - sitar
 Acyuta, Pandaveya - kartalas
 Acyuta, Adveita, Krishna, Priya, Ananda, Narayana, Gita, Hari Darshana, Maharaj, Lila - vocals
 Hari Darshana - mridanga
 Maurício Barros - keyboards
 Maharaj - harmonium

References

Nando Reis e os Infernais albums
2004 live albums